Taraco Municipality is the seventh municipal section of the Ingavi Province in the  La Paz Department, Bolivia. Most of its area is situated on Taraco Peninsula jutting into Lake Wiñaymarka, the southern branch of Lake Titicaca. Its seat is Taraco.

Division 
The municipality is divided into the following cantons:
 Santa Rosa de Taraco - 1,071 inhabitants (2001) 
 Taraco - 4,851 inhabitants

The people 
The people are predominantly indigenous citizens of Aymara descent.

Places of interest 
Some of the tourist attractions of the municipalities are:
 the archaeological sites on Taraco Peninsula:
 Chiripa and its museum
 Kala Uyuni, Pumani and Achacachi Coacollo in Coacollo
 Iwawi (Kolata Quenacache, Ojje Puku, Awichu and Chojna Qala) in Higuagui Grande
 Sikuya Island in Taraco Canton
 The church of Taraco dating from 1767 
 Taraco museum in Taraco Canton

References 

 www.ine.gov.bo / census 2001: Taraco Municipality

External links 
 Taraco Municipality: population data and map (Spanish) 

Municipalities of La Paz Department (Bolivia)